Beaconsfield station is a commuter rail station operated by Exo in Beaconsfield, Quebec, Canada. It is served by the Vaudreuil–Hudson line.

 on weekdays, all 11 inbound trains and 12 outbound trains on the line call at this station, with one train each way short turning here. On weekends, all trains (four on Saturday and three on Sunday in each direction) call here.

The station platforms are built on an overpass over Saint-Charles Boulevard, north of Autoroute 20. The historic station building is one of just two still serving passengers along this line (the other is Montréal-Ouest); a few more are extant but have been given over to other uses. In particular, a dedicated underpass between the station building and a headhouse links the two platforms. They are also linked by the sidewalks on both sides of Saint-Charles Boulevard and stairways leading from them to the platforms.

Bus connections

Société de transport de Montréal

References

External links
 Beaconsfield Commuter Train Station Information (RTM)
 Beaconsfield Commuter Train Station Schedule (RTM)
 2016 STM System Map
 

Exo commuter rail stations
Railway stations in Montreal
Beaconsfield, Quebec